= Rural commune (disambiguation) =

A rural commune is a medieval form of collaboration.

The term may also refer to:

- Rural communes of Morocco
- Rural commune (Vietnam)
